The Dirillo, or Acate, is a  river in Sicily which springs from the Hyblaean Mountains and flows through the areas of Vizzini, Licodia Eubea, Mazzarrone, Chiaramonte Gulfi, Acate, Vittoria, Gela. It enters the Strait of Sicily south-east of the town of Gela. As the largest river in the area it is sometimes known as the Fiume Grande.

The river was known in antiquity as the Achates. It was noted by Silius Italicus for the remarkable clearness of its waters. Theophrastus in his treatise On Stones  (ca. 315 B.C.) indicates that the name of the gemstone achates (agate) was based on the source of such stones from this river. Pliny the Elder makes the same connection in his Naturalis Historia
Agate and chalcedony can still be found here. During the period of Arab rule it became known as Wadi‑Ikrilu: ‘The River of Acrille’, an ancient Greek-Roman colony that stood in the surroundings.

In the 1950s the Azienda Nazionale Idrogenazione Combustibili dammed the river near Licodia Eubea to create Lago Dirillo, a reservoir for the Polo petrolchimico di Gela petrochemical plants. With good fishing and camping facilities, as well its natural scenic beauty, this area has become a tourist attraction.

Footnotes

References
This article includes material from its counterpart in the Italian-language Wikipedia « :it:Dirillo », specifically from this version.

External links
Dirillo river (Achates river), Acate, Ragusa Province, Sicily, Italy

Rivers of Italy
Rivers of Sicily
Gela
Rivers of the Province of Caltanissetta
Rivers of the Province of Catania
Rivers of the Province of Ragusa
European drainage basins of the Mediterranean Sea